for others with the same name, see Rudolf Steiner (disambiguation)

Rudolf Steiner, b. 1942, is a German film director, scriptwriter and producer. 

Steiner studied at the Film & Television Academy (HFF) "Konrad Wolf" in Potsdam-Babelsberg. From 1971 to 1973 he worked as a cameraman for Sender Freies Berlin (SFB).

As a producer he realized among other films Conversation with the Beast (director: Armin Mueller-Stahl).

Filmography 
 1987: 
 1988: 5 Beers + 1 Coffee
 1996: Conversation with the Beast

External links 

Rudolf Steiner at Filmportal.de
 http://www.rudolf-steiner-film.de

Film people from Berlin
1942 births
Living people